Saatchi is a 1983 Indian Tamil-language action film, directed by S. A. Chandrasekhar and produced by P. S. V. Hariharan. The film stars Vijayakanth, Viji and M. N. Nambiar. It is a remake of the 1981 Malayalam film Raktham. The film was released in 16 September 1983.

Plot

Cast 
Vijayakanth
Viji
M. N. Nambiar
Pandari Bai
Senthil
V. Gopalakrishnan
Sangili Murugan
Vennira Aadai Moorthy
Nizhalgal Ravi

Production 
The lead role was offered to Prabhu, and later Karthik, both of whom declined; Vijayakanth was ultimately cast. Filming took place in Salem.

Soundtrack 
The music was composed by Shankar–Ganesh.

References

External links 
 

1980s Tamil-language films
1983 action films
1983 films
Films directed by S. A. Chandrasekhar
Films scored by Shankar–Ganesh
Indian action films
Indian films about revenge
Tamil remakes of Malayalam films